Me, My House & I is a Canadian television series which premiered on the W Network in 2003. It was produced by Mountain Road Productions.

Awards

|-
| 2006
| Me, My House & I
| Summit Awards (SIA), Category: Movie/Film Music Website
|  Bronze
|-
| 2004
| Me, My House & I
| Gemini Award, Category: Best Practical Information Series
|  
|-

External links 
 Official website
 Me, My House & I on Mountain Road Productions
 https://web.archive.org/web/20110906111450/http://expressmedia.ca/store/index.php?cPath=21_36

2003 Canadian television series debuts
2006 Canadian television series endings
2000s Canadian reality television series
W Network original programming